The 2011 season was Sporting Cristal's 56th season in the Peruvian First Division, and also the club's 56th consecutive season in the top-flight of Peruvian football.

2011 squad

Transfers

In
.

Out
As of 1 December 2011.

Team kit

|
|
|

Competitions

Overall
This season Sporting Cristal participated in two major competitions: the Torneo Descentralizado and the Torneo Intermedio.

Torneo Descentralizado

Torneo Intermedio

First round

Round of 16

Quarter-finals

Semi-finals

José Gálvez FBC won 2–1 on aggregate.

Squad statistics
As of 31 December 2011.

[R] - Reserve team player from Sporting Cristal Reserves and Academy.
[T] - Transferred out during the season. See 2011 Sporting Cristal season#Out

References

External links

2011
Sporting Cristal